The César Award for Best First Feature Film is an award presented by the Académie des Arts et Techniques du Cinéma since 1982. It was originally named the César Award for Best Debut (César de la meilleure première œuvre in French) between 1982 and 1999, and  César Award for Best Debut in Fiction (César de la meilleure première œuvre de fiction) until 2005, when it has been renamed again in 2006 to its current name.

Winners and nominees

1980s

1990s

2000s

2010s

2020s

See also
Lumières Award for Best First Film
Louis Delluc Prize for Best First Film
French Syndicate of Cinema Critics — Best First Film
Magritte Award for Best First Feature Film

References

External links 
  
 César Award for Best First Feature Film at AlloCiné

First Feature Film

Directorial debut film awards